Buckwell Place is a country house within the civil parish of Herstmonceux, East Sussex, England. It is a privately owned Grade II* listed building, and is not open to the public.

Buckwell Place was the childhood home of the travel-writer and raconteur Augustus Hare, and his uncle, the theologian Julius Charles Hare, who entertained a number of "eminent victorians", namely Thomas Carlyle.

History 

Rev. Robert Hare - of the Hare family who owned nearby Herstmonceux Castle - built the original wing of the house in 1792 as a rectory for himself. His nephew, the theologian Julius Charles Hare later occupied the house and extended it in 1833, by constructing a parlour wing and bedroom above. Julius Hare also constructed a domed conservatory between the original wing and the new parlour wing. It has been written that Julius Hare's library at Buckwell Place was "famous" and he entertained a number of "eminent victorians" including the essayist, historian and philosopher Thomas Carlyle.

Julius Hare had a nephew, the travel-writer and raconteur Augustus Hare, who was born in 1834, in Rome. Augustus Hare was adopted by his aunt Maria (the widowed sister-in-law of Julius), after being his parents renounced all further claim to him. Augustus was then brought up and home-educated by Maria Hare at Julius Hare's house, the newly extended Buckwell Place. Augustus wrote about his childhood at Buckwell Place in his autobiography, The Story of My Life (1896-1900).

After Julius Hare's death in 1855, the house was occupied by the Rev. Henry Wellesley, an illegitimate nephew of the Duke of Wellington. Wellesley constructed a service wing to the west in c.1860. Little is known about the history of Buckwell Place following the death of Wellesley, but it remains a private house today and is no longer a rectory.

Architecture 
The entry for the Grade II* listing from Historic England reads:Large former rectory, now private house...North East or entrance front of original wing has two storeys four windows. Four twelve-pane sashes to first floor (the third a blank with slate partition behind) and three curved blank panels to ground floor and curved recessed doorcase with Gibbs surround...Garden front to south east has four twelve-pane sashes (the third on first floor blank with slate partition behind). The rear elevation of this wing has three storeys with six pane sashes to second floor, twelve pane sashes to lower floors and round-headed staircase window on right hand side...The principal feature of the house is a domed conservatory of c1833 built between the original wing and the parlour wing of 1833. This has thin iron ribs with small panes of curved glass and circular cast iron ventilation slits with iron urn finial on a stuccoed base approached up three tooled stone steps.

Original library, now lounge, has c1830 marble fireplace surround with reeded pilasters and roundels and door with marginal glazing. Curved late C18 staircase with mahogany handrail and six panelled door nearby. Old kitchen has wooden segmental fireplace with central keystone, iron crane and Eagle cast iron range. Cellar has stone staircase with iron handrail and wine bins of c1833 in tooled stone niches. Dining Room has some possibly C18 chinese wallpaper, but this is not original to the house.

References

Country houses in East Sussex
Grade II* listed houses
Grade II* listed buildings in East Sussex
Herstmonceux